Pei Wei may refer to:

 Pei Wei (Jin dynasty) (267–300), Jin dynasty minister and xuanxue thinker
 Northern Wei (386–535), Xianbei-ruled dynasty during China's Northern and Southern dynasties period
 Pei Wei Asian Diner, American restaurant chain

See also
 Pei-Yuan Wei, web browser pioneer